Gajol Haji Nakoo Muhammad High School, also known as Gajol H. N. M. High School, is a school for both boys and girls but it has no girl student and it is situated at Gazole village, Gazole block, Malda district, West Bengal, India. It was established in 1942.

Affiliations 
The school is affiliated to West Bengal Board of Secondary Education for Madhyamik and to West Bengal Council of Higher Secondary Education.

References

External links 
 
Facebook Page

Boys' schools in India
High schools and secondary schools in West Bengal
Schools in Malda district
Educational institutions established in 1942
1942 establishments in India